The following is the discography of the South Korean boy band Supernova which consists of ten studio albums, one live album, six compilation albums, one extended play, and thirty-three singles. Known as Choshinsei for their Japanese releases, the group debuted in 2007 with the single "Hit" from their album The Beautiful Stardust in South Korea.

Albums

Studio albums

Live albums

Compilation albums

Extended plays

Singles

Soundtrack appearances

Videography

Video albums

Music videos

Notes

References

Discographies of South Korean artists
K-pop music group discographies